Agrupación Deportiva Ferroviaria is a football team based in Madrid, in the Community of Madrid. Founded in 1918, the club plays in Tercera Regional de Aficionados – Group 10.

History 
The club was founded in December, 1918 with Leocadio Martín Ruiz as its first president. The club withdrew from playing in 2007, and their last season (2006/07) the team played in Segunda Regional de Aficionados.

For the 2019–20 season, Ferroviaria returned to an active status, playing in Tercera Regional de Aficionados.

Season to seasons

3 seasons in Segunda División
9 seasons in Tercera División

Uniform

Famous players
Tomás Castro
Joaquín Peiró
Mingorance
Teo

Famous Coaches
Alfonso Sanz

Chairmans

Stadiums
The club started playing in the field of Vallehermoso until the year 1920, which opened Las Delicias. During the 50s, it did in the field of Gas CF, was the last field Ernesto Cotorruelo.

Honours
 Copa Luzán
 Campeón de Castilla y de España de aficionados

References 

Association football clubs established in 1918
Football clubs in Madrid
1918 establishments in Spain
Segunda División clubs